Pogonomyrmex rugosus, the desert harvester ant or rough harvester ant, is a species of harvester ant in the subfamily Myrmicinae which is endemic to the southwestern United States, specifically New Mexico and southern Colorado.

Colonies 
P. rugosus colonies can grow to have up to 15,000 workers.

Behavior

Foraging Tactics 
P. rugosus workers use group foraging tactics that involve the creation of permanent pathways (trunk trails). They also use pheromones trails to draw other workers to areas of food-availability.

Interspecies Interactions 
Two other species of harvester ants, Pogonomyrmex anergismus and Pogonomyrmex colei, have no workers of their own. Instead, they live in the colonies of P. rugosus and Pogonomyrmex barbatus (red harvester ant) and enslave workers to raise reproductive males and females for them.

References

External links

rugosus
Endemic fauna of the United States
Insects of the United States
Hymenoptera of North America
Insects described in 1895